The Srinagar Metro is a light rail transit planned for the city of Srinagar, Jammu and Kashmir, India. The plans for the Srinagar Metro have been finalised with the work expected to start once the project gets nod from union cabinet. The proposed network will have two corridors. Each corridor of Srinagar metro will have 12 stations each with the total cost expected to be ₹5,559 crore.

Former Delhi Metro Rail Corporation (DMRC) chief E. Sreedharan, who is popularly known as 'Metro Man' following his success in Konkan railway and Delhi Metro, was appointed as the project head.

History
Jammu and Kashmir state government has planned to introduce a metro rail system in cities of Srinagar and Jammu which respectively serve as Summer and winter capital of the state. The government had hired an infrastructure development enterprise, RITES to conduct a traffic analysis. The government has planned to approach Delhi Metro Rail Corporation for a detailed project including feasibility and financial viability.

The Detailed Project Report (DPR) was completed by RITES and it was submitted to the Ministry of Home and Urban Affairs. The two projects in Jammu and Srinagar respectively were estimated to cost around ₹10,559 crores, with each project expected to be completed by 2024 if the Union Cabinet gives the nod. Lieutenant governor, Manoj Sinha said that the tendering process will be initiated once the project is reviewed and approved by PMO and Union Cabinet.

Route
Two elevated corridors have been planned in Phase 1, with an estimated ridership of 200,000 by the year 2027. The Line 2 is planned to be extended until Srinagar Airport in phase 2. The depot is set to be constructed near HMT Junction of Line 1.

See also
 Urban rail transit in India
 Aerial lift in India

References

Proposed rapid transit in India
Transport in Srinagar